For the Summer Olympics, there are 34 venues that have been or will be used for water polo. Debuting in 1900, the first venues took place similar to that of the swimming events. By the 1908 Games, the first water polo venue not located on a river or a lake took place. It was not until the 1920 Games that a separate venue was created for the aquatic venues. 1948 was the first Olympics in water polo took place both indoor and in more than one venue. The first separate water polo venue that was not connected to other aquatic venues was at the 1964 Summer Olympics in Tokyo.

See also
 Water polo at the Summer Olympics

 Lists of Olympic water polo records and statistics
 List of men's Olympic water polo tournament records and statistics
 List of women's Olympic water polo tournament records and statistics
 List of Olympic champions in men's water polo
 List of Olympic champions in women's water polo
 National team appearances in the men's Olympic water polo tournament
 National team appearances in the women's Olympic water polo tournament
 List of players who have appeared in multiple men's Olympic water polo tournaments
 List of players who have appeared in multiple women's Olympic water polo tournaments
 List of Olympic medalists in water polo (men)
 List of Olympic medalists in water polo (women)
 List of men's Olympic water polo tournament top goalscorers
 List of women's Olympic water polo tournament top goalscorers
 List of men's Olympic water polo tournament goalkeepers
 List of women's Olympic water polo tournament goalkeepers

References

Sources

Venues
Olympic venues
Water polo